10370 Hylonome is a minor planet orbiting in the outer Solar System. It was discovered on 27 February 1995, by English astronomer David C. Jewitt and Vietnamese American astronomer Jane Luu at the U.S. Mauna Kea Observatory in Hawaii, and later named after the mythological creature Hylonome.

Classification and orbit 

Centaurs are a large population of icy bodies in transition between trans-Neptunian objects (TNOs) and Jupiter-family comets (JFCs), their orbits being unstable due to perturbations by the giant planets. Currently, Uranus controls Hylonomes perihelion and Neptune its aphelion.

Hylonome is a carbonaceous C-type body that orbits the Sun in the outer main-belt at a distance of 18.9–31.4 AU once every 126 years and 2 months (46,073 days). Its orbit has an eccentricity of 0.25 and an inclination of 4° with respect to the ecliptic. It is a Neptune-crosser, and an outer-grazer of the orbit of Uranus, which it hence does not cross. Its minimum orbital intersection distance with Neptune and Uranus is 0.35854 and 0.52875 AU, respectively.

It is estimated to have a relatively long orbital half-life of about 6.37 million years. In the year 3478, it will pass within approximately 85 gigameters of Uranus and its semi-major axis will be reduced from 25.1 to 23.5 AU.

Naming 

This minor planet was named for Hylonome, a female centaur in Greek mythology. In the epic tragedy, she lost her very much beloved husband, the handsome centaur Cyllarus, who was accidentally killed by a spear. Heartbroken, she then took her own life to join him by throwing herself on the spear. The official  was published on 26 July 2000.

A symbol derived from that for 2060 Chiron, was devised in the late 1990s by German astrologer Robert von Heeren. It replaces Chiron's K with a Greek capital upsilon (Υ) for Hylonome (Ὑλονόμη).

Physical characteristics 

Observations with the infrared Spitzer Space Telescope indicate a diameter of  kilometers, whereas the Collaborative Asteroid Lightcurve Link assumes a standard albedo for carbonaceous bodies of 0.057, giving it a diameter of 75.1 kilometers with an absolute magnitude of 9.35.

The study concluded that among the observed population of centaurs, there is no correlation between their sizes, albedos, and orbital parameters. However, the smaller the centaur, the more reddish it is.

See also

References

External links 
  as seen around 08 Sept 2009 by the new Hubble WFC3.
 List Of Centaurs and Scattered-Disk Objects, Minor Planet Center
 Discovery Circumstances: Numbered Minor Planets (10001)-(15000) – Minor Planet Center
 AstDyS – (10370) Hylonome Ephemerides
 Asteroid Lightcurve Database (LCDB), query form (info )
 Dictionary of Minor Planet Names, Google books
 Asteroids and comets rotation curves, CdR – Geneva Observatory, Raoul Behrend
 
 

Centaurs (small Solar System bodies)
Discoveries by David C. Jewitt
Discoveries by Jane Luu
Named minor planets
19950227